Morozovsk is a town and the administrative center of Morozovsky District in Rostov Oblast, Russia, located on the Bystraya River (left tributary of the Seversky Donets),  northeast of Rostov-on-Don, the administrative center of the oblast. Population:

History

The khutor of Morozov was founded in the 1880s. In 1900, Morozovskaya railway station, named after it, was opened nearby. In 1910, the stanitsa of Taubeyevskaya was established near the railway station. It was renamed Morozovskaya on April 24, 1917. Later, these two rural localities grew and merged, and the resulting settlement was granted town status in 1941.

Administrative and municipal status
Within the framework of administrative divisions, Morozovsk serves as the administrative center of Morozovsky District. As an administrative division, it is incorporated within Morozovsky District as Morozovskoye Urban Settlement. As a municipal division, this administrative unit also has urban settlement status and is a part of Morozovsky Municipal District.

Military

Attractions

There are many monuments and museums In Morozovsk.

thumb|left|260px| Train station in Morozovsk 

 Near the train station is a monument to the steam Locomotive.

 Morozov Museum was opened in 1994. The Museum building was built in the early twentieth century on the outskirts of the former farm Lyubimov. The facade of the Museum there are four bas-relief. On two bas-reliefs shows a smithy with two blacksmiths, harrowing land, two drawn by oxen, on the other — Cossack on horseback with  guns.

 Monument to the fallen soldiers of the Soviet army who died during the great Patriotic war.

 A monument in honor of the Soviet victory over Nazi Germany — the MiG-21. 

 The Church Of The Intercession Of The Blessed Virgin Mary.  The Church was built by the project Fomin, Konstantin Ivanovich in 1914. The Church was consecrated on 25 April 1915. The Church operated until the mid 1930-ies. Was built next to a military town and the Church were in its territory. So the temple remained standing until the end of 1940-ies. During the war the temple was destroyed the bell tower. After the war the Church was a military warehouse. In 2001 began the restoration of the temple. In the temple are the icon of St. Nikolay Popov with relics, the icon of Matrona of Moscow with a particle of the relics, the icon of the Holy virgin.

Literature
 ФГУП «Южное Аэрогеодезическое Предприятие» Атлас Ростовская область Города, 2007.

 Краснознамённый Киевский. Очерки истории Краснознамённого Киевского военного округа (1919-1979). Издание второе, исправленное и дополненное. Киев, издательство политической литературы Украины, 1979.

 Военный энциклопедический словарь. М., Военное издательство, 1984.

 Справочник «Освобождение городов: Справочник по освобождению городов в период Великой Отечественной войны 1941-1945». М. Л. Дударенко, Ю. Г. Перечнев, В. Т. Елисеев и др. М.: Воениздат, 1985. 598 с.

References

Notes

Sources

Cities and towns in Rostov Oblast
Don Host Oblast